Good Right (BD) is a liberal political party in Italy.

History
The party was founded on 3 July 2020 by journalist Filippo Rossi, who was the editor of FareFuturo's web magazine between 2009 and 2011, and who published an essay in 2019 (On Jekyll's side: manifesto for a good right), in which he criticized the populist and sovereign drift of the Italian centre-right represented by Matteo Salvini and Giorgia Meloni. He compared his party to the moderate European parties, like the French The Republicans and the German Christian Democratic Union, for their firm stance against the eurosceptic parties, as he pointed out that in Italy instead the centre-right and the eurosceptics parties are allied. He stated his preference for the United States of Europe as the ultimate goal for the European Union.

In 2021 he supported Carlo Calenda's candidacy for the 2021 Rome municipal election and then he supported Roberto Lagalla's candidacy for the 2022 Palermo municipal election. For the 2022 Italian general election, Rossi decided to support Action.

References

External links

2020 establishments in Italy
Political parties established in 2020
Liberal parties in Italy
Liberal conservative parties
Conservative liberal parties
Pro-European political parties in Italy